Chunjiang is a southern subdistrict of Fuyang, Hangzhou City in Zhejiang Province, China. The well-known Tianzhong Mountain lies to the south of Chunjiang.

Administrative districts 
Chunjiang has administrative jurisdiction over nine rural townships: Jianshe Village, Taiping Village, Linjiang Village,, Chunjiang Village Zhongsha Village, Bayi Village, Xinjian Village, Minzhu Village and Shanjian Village.

Industry and infrastructure 
White board paper is manufactured in Chunjiang. The south bus station is a major hub of the Fuyang traffic network.

References

Geography of Hangzhou
Township-level divisions of Zhejiang